Mary Nichols (born November 18, 1949) is an American politician. She was a member of the Missouri House of Representatives from 2009 to 2019. She is a member of the Democratic Party.

References

1949 births
21st-century American politicians
21st-century American women politicians
Living people
Democratic Party members of the Missouri House of Representatives
Politicians from St. Louis County, Missouri
Women state legislators in Missouri